Miss Venezuela 1996 was the 43rd Miss Venezuela pageant, was held in Caracas, Venezuela, on September 6, 1996, after weeks of events.  The winner of the pageant was Marena Bencomo, Miss Carabobo.

The pageant was broadcast live on Venevision from the Poliedro de Caracas in Caracas. At the conclusion of the final night of competition, outgoing titleholder Alicia Machado, Miss Venezuela 1995 and Miss Universe 1996, crowned Marena Bencomo of Carabobo as the new Miss Venezuela.

Results

Special awards
 Miss Photogenic (voted by press reporters) - Consuelo Adler (Miss Miranda)
 Miss Congeniality (voted by Miss Venezuela contestants) - Michelina Nuzzo (Miss Trujillo)
 Miss Elegance - Gabriela Vergara (Miss Barinas)
 Best Body - Milena Romero (Miss Anzoátegui)
 Most Beautiful Eyes - Rossi Conde (Miss Delta Amacuro)
 Best Hair - Tatiana Irizar (Miss Táchira)
 Best Skin - Consuelo Adler (Miss Miranda)

Delegates
The Miss Venezuela 1996 delegates are:

 Miss Amazonas - Marina Lisabon Yolanda Taylhardat Ares
 Miss Anzoátegui - Milena del Carmen Romero Anduz
 Miss Apure - Malena Carolina Bello Bolívar
 Miss Aragua - Marjorie Correa Gallo
 Miss Barinas - Gabriela Vergara Aranguren
 Miss Bolívar - Samantha Verónica Blanco Csiszer
 Miss Carabobo - Marena Josefina Bencomo Giménez
 Miss Cojedes - Alexandra Karina Sánchez-Biezma Fernández
 Miss Costa Oriental - Karelys Margarita Ollarves Villarreal
 Miss Delta Amacuro - Rossi Aurelys Conde Rodríguez
 Miss Dependencias Federales - Carolina Elena Carvalho García
 Miss Distrito Federal - Lucila Margarita Weil Viso
 Miss Falcón - Nina Major's (Yazmin Madeleine Fuenmayor Bracho)
 Miss Guárico - Patricia Elena Ossorio Alvarez
 Miss Lara - Adelaida Pifano Freitez
 Miss Mérida - Hildegard Germaine Gehrenbeck Gabaldón
 Miss Miranda  - Consuelo Adler Hernández
 Miss Monagas - Ana Karina Hoyos Mora
 Miss Municipio Libertador - Carol Grace Ginter Sagadín
 Miss Municipio Vargas - Yaridis Margarita Adrián Delgado
 Miss Nueva Esparta - Anna Cepinska Miszak
 Miss Península Goajira - Carola Thais Montiel Alvarez
 Miss Portuguesa - Gabriela Alejandra Guédez Contreras
 Miss Sucre - Cibel Trudy Marrero Díaz
 Miss Táchira - Tatiana Irizar Zabala
 Miss Trujillo - Michelina Nuzzo Franco
 Miss Yaracuy - Romina Natalia Meraviglia Kodelia
 Miss Zulia - Lorena Franceschi Valconi

Contestants Notes
Marena Bencomo was named 1st runner-up in Miss Universe 1997 in Miami, Florida, United States. Prior to her participation in that event, she attended the Reinado Internacional del Café 1997 in Manizales, Colombia where she placed as Virreina.
Anna Cepinska placed as 3rd runner-up in Miss World 1996 in Bangalore, India. Years later, she competed in a pageant called Miss Blonde and was 1st runner-up. She lives in Mexico since 2003.
Consuelo Adler won the Miss International 1997 pageant in Kyoto, Japan.
Adelaida Pifano placed as 2nd runner-up in Nuestra Belleza Internacional 1996, wearing a gown made of swarovski crystals with a total weight of 25 pounds.
Gabriela Vergara was crowned Reina Sudamericana 1996 in Bolivia.
Romina Meraviglia (Yaracuy) placed as 3rd runner-up in Miss Italy in the World 1997.
Karelys Ollarves (Costa Oriental) was crowned Miss Caribbean World 1997 in Aruba.
Tatiana Irizar became a famous TV presenter.
Karelys Ollarves (Costa Oriental) and Hildegard Gehrenbeck (Mérida) competed in the Miss Republica Boliviariana de Venezuela 2000 contest.
Carol Ginter (Municipio Libertador) is now a known fashion designer.
Gabriela Guedez (Portuguesa) was host of a children's TV show.

External links
Miss Venezuela official website

1996 beauty pageants
1996 in Venezuela